Jenny Annette Derek is an Australian model and beauty queen. She became the second Australian to win the Miss International pageant.

Her victory in 1981, beating 41 other contestants in Kobe, Japan, came 19 years after Tania Verstak took home the title.

Jenny went on to a successful modeling career in Adelaide. She appeared in Wheel of Fortune as the prizes hostess for several years.

She and her husband John owned The Body Shop franchise in South Australia until 2011. She is currently still in retail and had 3 children

References

External links
Official Miss International website - Past titleholders

Miss International winners
Living people
Australian beauty pageant winners
Miss International 1981 delegates
Year of birth missing (living people)